Evan Roberts (19 September 1861 – 16 October 1927) was a Welsh international rugby union player who played club rugby for Llanelli and international rugby for Wales.

Rugby career
Roberts was selected to play for Wales in two international rugby union matches, both while playing club rugby for Llanelli. His first cap was in a match against England as part of the 1886 Home Nations Championship; Roberts came into the pack with three other new caps, and at fullback, Llanelli team-mate Harry Bowen. Wales lost the match by a narrow margin, and when the Welsh team experimented with the four three-quarters in the next match, against Scotland, Roberts was one of the forward players dropped from the pack. Roberts played one more match for Wales, the final game of the 1887 Home Nations Championship, against Ireland. Wales had dropped the four three-quarter system for the 1887 Championship, and Roberts was brought in to replace Bob Gould. Although Ireland scored three tries to Wales one, a Welsh dropped goal gave them the victory. Despite the win, Roberts was not chosen to represent his country again.

International matches played
Wales (rugby union)
  1886
  1887

Bibliography

References 

1861 births
1927 deaths
Llanelli RFC players
Rugby union forwards
Rugby union players from Llanelli
Wales international rugby union players
Welsh rugby union players